Il n'y a plus rien (English: There Is No More) is an album by Léo Ferré, released in 1973 by Barclay Records. The general mood here is dark, both exasperated and desperate.

History
After having inserted two symphonic songs ("Ton style", "Tu ne dis jamais rien") in his mostly pop rock oriented album La Solitude (1971), after having re-recorded his 1950s oratorio on Guillaume Apollinaire's vast poem La Chanson du mal-aimé ("Song of the Poorly Loved", 1972), Ferré feels now ready to establish himself as a complete artist, author and musician, who will do without any arrangers' services from now. So here he goes completely symphonic with his own material for the first time (he had gone orchestral before with arranger Jean-Michel Defaye but it was mostly on renowned material by French poets from the 19th century - see Verlaine et Rimbaud and Léo Ferré chante Baudelaire albums) and he often replaces singing by intense spoken-word and declamation.

This very cohesive album opens with the straightforward manifesto "Preface", a reduction of a much longer text that precisely prefaces Poète... vos papiers! (Poet... your documents!), a collection of his poems formerly published in January 1957. As Ferré says, "the most beautiful songs are songs that demand justice". The discipline of poetry is meant to teach us how to fight so we can free our mind:

The album ends with the radical, pessimistic yet epic and fighting "Il n'y a plus rien" ("There is no more"), that deals with libertarian and revolutionary utopias disappointment from the 1960s and May 68. This anarchist outburst is an example of one of the first uses of whale vocalization in popular music.

Track listing
All songs written, composed, arranged and directed by Léo Ferré, except Ne chantez pas la mort whose text is written by Jean-Roger Caussimon.

Original LP

Credits 
 Danielle Licari: voice
 The orchestra consists of session musicians hired for the recording
 Arranger & orchestra conductor: Léo Ferré
 Director of engineering: Claude Achallé
 Engineers: Charles Rochko, Philippe Omnes
 Executive producer: Richard Marsan
 Artwork: Patrick Ullmann, Geneviève Vanhaecke

External links 
 English translation of Night and day.
 Album presentation (French)

References 

Léo Ferré albums
French-language albums
Barclay (record label) albums
1973 albums